Feliks is a variant spelling of the given name Felix, used in Poland and the Baltic states, as well as in the transliteration of the name Felix from Russian.

Feliks may refer to:

Feliks Ankerstein (1897–1955), Polish Army major and intelligence officer
Feliks Gromov (born 1937), former Commander-in-Chief of the Russian Navy
Feliks Kark (born 1933), Estonian actor and caricaturist
Feliks Kibbermann, Estonian chess master
Feliks Kon (1864–1941), Polish communist activist
Feliks Konarski (1907–1991), Polish poet, songwriter and cabaret performer
Feliks Koneczny (1862–1949), Polish historian and social philosopher
Feliks Kazimierz Potocki (1630–1702), Polish noble, magnate and military leader
Feliks Stamm (1901–1976), Polish boxing coach
Feliks Topolski (1907–1989), Polish-born British expressionist painter
Feliks Undusk (born 1948), Estonian journalist and politician. 
Feliks Villard (1908–?), Estonian chess player
Feliks Zamoyski (died 1535), Polish nobleman
Feliks Zemdegs (born 1995), Australian Rubik's Cube speedcuber

See also
 
  (1922–2005), scholar of botany and zoology in the Bible and the Talmud 

Polish masculine given names
Estonian masculine given names